Tara E. Nummedal is a professor of history and Italian studies at Brown University, where she holds the John Nickoll Provost’s Professorship in History. Nummedal is known for her works on Anna Maria Zieglerin and the history of alchemy and natural science in early modern Europe.

Biography
Nummedal is originally from Seal Beach, California, and is a 1992 graduate of Pomona College. After earning a master's degree at the University of California, Davis in 1996, she completed her Ph.D. at Stanford University in 2001.

She joined the Brown University faculty in 2002. Her husband, Seth Rockman, is also a historian at Brown University.

Publications

Books
Alchemy and Authority in the Holy Roman Empire (University of Chicago Press, 2007)
Anna Zieglerin and the Lion’s Blood: Alchemy and End Times in Reformation Germany (University of Pennsylvania Press, 2019)
John Abbot and William Swainson: Art, Science, and Commerce in 19th-Century Natural History Illustration (with Janice Neri and John V. Calhoun, University of Alabama Press, 2019).

Editor
With Donna Bilak, she is also the editor of a critical edition of Atalanta Fugiens by Michael Maier, Furnace and Fugue: A Digital Edition of Michael Maier's Atalanta fugiens with Scholarly Commentary (University of Virginia Press, 2020).

Recognition
Nummedal was named a Guggenheim Fellow in 2009.

References

External links
Home page
Tara Nummedal, Women Also Know History

Year of birth missing (living people)
Living people
People from Seal Beach, California
American women historians
Historians of science
Pomona College alumni
University of California, Davis alumni
Brown University faculty
Historians from California
21st-century American women